Wakasihu, or Larike-Wakasihu after the two still-vigorous dialects, is an Austronesian language of Ambon Island in the Maluku Islands.

Phonology 

Phonemes in parentheses are borrowed from other languages.

 are heard as  when in closed or stressed syllable position.

References

Further reading

 
 
 

Central Maluku languages
Languages of the Maluku Islands